In enzymology, a kaempferol 3-O-galactosyltransferase is an enzyme that catalyzes the chemical reaction

UDP-galactose + kaempferol  UDP + kaempferol 3-O-beta-D-galactoside

Thus, the two substrates of this enzyme are UDP-galactose and kaempferol, whereas its two products are UDP and trifolin.

This enzyme belongs to the family of glycosyltransferases, specifically the hexosyltransferases.  The systematic name of this enzyme class is UDP-galactose:kaempferol 3-O-beta-D-galactosyltransferase. This enzyme is also called F3GalTase.

References 

 

EC 2.4.1
Enzymes of unknown structure
Kaempferol